Angelo Dominick Roncallo (May 28, 1927 – May 4, 2010) was a Republican member of the United States House of Representatives from Nassau County, New York.

Roncallo was born in Port Chester, New York. He served in the United States Army from 1944 until 1945. He graduated from Manhattan College in 1950 and received a law degree from Georgetown University in 1953. He served as a town councilman for the town of Oyster Bay, New York, from 1965 until 1967 and as comptroller of Nassau County, New York, from 1968 until 1972.

He was a delegate to the 1972 Republican National Convention. He was elected to Congress in 1972 and served from January 3, 1973, until January 3, 1975. He unsuccessfully ran for re-election against Jerome A. Ambro, Jr. He served as a justice of the New York Supreme Court from 1977 until 1995. He was a resident of Massapequa, New York, for many years. He died on May 4, 2010.

Sources

EXTERNAL SITE

Newsday Obit via Legacy
http://www.legacy.com/obituaries/newsday/obituary.aspx?page=lifestory&pid=142505597

1927 births
2010 deaths
Georgetown University Law Center alumni
New York Supreme Court Justices
People from Port Chester, New York
Manhattan College alumni
Republican Party members of the United States House of Representatives from New York (state)
People from Massapequa, New York
20th-century American politicians
20th-century American judges
American people of Italian descent